Sosnowo  (formerly ) is a village in the administrative district of Gmina Banie, within Gryfino County, West Pomeranian Voivodeship, in north-western Poland.

For the history of the region, see the History of Pomerania.

The village has a population of 150.

References

Sosnowo